Boudinotiana hodeberti is a species of geometrid moth in the family Geometridae. It was described from Asian material that was mistakenly attributed to Labrador (NL) in North America.

The MONA or Hodges number for Boudinotiana hodeberti is 6256.1.

References

Further reading

 
 

Archiearinae
Articles created by Qbugbot
Moths described in 2002